United States v. Peters, 3 U.S. (3 Dall.) 121 (1795), was a United States Supreme Court case determining that the federal district court has no jurisdiction over a foreign privateer where the intended captured ship was not within the jurisdiction of the court. The Supreme Court may prohibit the district court from proceeding in such a matter. In the decision the court held:
The district court has no jurisdiction of a libel for damages, against a privateer, commissioned by a foreign belligerent power, for the capture of an American vessel as prize—the captured vessel not being within the jurisdiction.

The supreme court will grant a writ of prohibition to a district judge, when he is proceeding in a cause of which the district court has no jurisdiction.

See also
 List of United States Supreme Court cases, volume 3
 Richard Peters (Continental Congress)

References

External links
 

United States Supreme Court cases
1795 in United States case law
United States Supreme Court cases of the Rutledge Court